Strange Attractor may refer to:
 A strange attractor, in the mathematical field of dynamical systems
Strange Attractor (album), a 2017 album by Alphaville
Strange Attractor, a bonus album by Mercury Rev, available with Snowflake Midnight
"Strange Attractor" (song), a 2012 single by Animal Kingdom
"Strange Attractor", a song by Nagi Yanagi
Strange Attractor Press, a UK publishing house

See also
"Strange Attractors", a 2009 episode of the TV series Heroes